Maccabi Sektzia Ma'alot-Tarshiha is an Israeli football club based in Ma'alot-Tarshiha. They are currently in Liga Alef North division.

History
The club played mostly in the lower divisions of Israeli football. in the 2004–05 season, they were promoted for the first time in their history to Liga Alef, after they won Liga Bet North A division. They had finished their debut season in Liga Alef North in the 6th place, however, they were relegated back to Liga Bet in the following season, after they finished bottom in Liga Alef North. in the 2010–11 season the club won Liga Bet North A division for the second time, and returned to Liga Alef. in their comeback season in Liga Alef North, the club achieved their best placing to date, by finishing in the 4th place. however, once again, they were relegated back to Liga Bet in the following season, after another bottom finish.

The club made a remarkable run in 2013–14 Israel State Cup while playing in Liga Bet, the fourth tier of Israeli football, after they eliminated Liga Leumit clubs, Hakoah Amidar Ramat Gan by a result of 3–0, and Hapoel Petah Tikva by a result of 2–1, and reached the Quarter-finals, where they were hammered 0–8 by top flight club, Maccabi Petah Tikva in HaMoshava Stadium.

In the same season, the club finished third in Liga North A, and qualified to the promotion play-offs, and after beating F.C. Ahva Kafr Manda, Hapoel Shefa-'Amr, and Maccabi Ahi Iksal faced Hapoel Daliyat al-Karmel in the decisive promotion/relegation play-offs. Ma'alot won 6–5 on penalties after a goalless draw, and promoted to Liga Alef.

Honours
Liga Bet North A:
2004–05, 2010–11

External links
Maccabi Sektzia Ma'alot-Tarshiha The Israel Football Association

References

Sektzia Ma'alot-Tarshiha
Sektzia Ma'alot-Tarshiha
Arab-Israeli football clubs